"You Can't Fool Me Dennis" was the third single by Mystery Jets, released in October 2005. The song was later released as part of their début album, Making Dens, albeit in a slightly altered, re-recorded form.

Track listings
All songs written by Mystery Jets.

7" vinyl (679L109)
 "You Can't Fool Me Dennis" – 3:39
 "Quite A Delight" – 1:51

CD (679L109CD)
 "You Can't Fool Me Dennis" – 3:39
 "Ageless" – 5:59

Limited edition 7" vinyl (679L109X)
 "You Can't Fool Me Dennis (Justice mix)" – 3:59
 "You Can't Fool Me Dennis (acoustic version)" – 04:20

Limited edition 12" vinyl (MSYTJ01)
 "You Can't Fool Me Dennis (Justice mix)" – 03:59
 "You Can't Fool Me Dennis (Straight Bat version)" – 05:14
 "Zoo Time (Erol Alkan rework)" – 04:55

2005 singles
2006 singles
Mystery Jets songs
2005 songs
679 Artists singles